Seven Inches of Satanic Panic is a release by the Swedish rock band Ghost. First released digitally on 13 September 2019 by Loma Vista Recordings, it features the songs "Kiss the Go-Goat" and "Mary on a Cross", written by vocalist Tobias Forge along with songwriters Salem al Fakir and Vincent Pontare. It was later released on 7" vinyl. Seven Inches of Satanic Panic has been described as a two-track EP and as a single.

Background and themes
According to Ghost's fictional backstory, Seven Inches of Satanic Panic contains two songs that were written and recorded by an early incarnation of the  band in 1969, when Papa Emeritus Nihil was the vocalist. The 7" vinyl release claims to be remastered versions of songs recorded in 1969 at Thorn Industrial Audio Recording Studios, Hollywood.

According to Kelsey Chapstick of Revolver, "Kiss the Go-Goat" explores the favorite theme of Tobias Forge, leader of Ghost and the musician behind their Papa Emeritus character; "Lucifer, and the joy of giving yourself over to him."

Paul Travers of Metal Hammer described the ambiguous lyrics of "Mary on a Cross" as a "provocative mash-up of Biblical and sexual imagery." Forge has been hesitant to explain the meaning behind the song, but admits there are multiple layers to the lyrics; "The chorus is written very tongue in cheek of course. 'Go down' doesn't necessarily mean as in a 69 sense of the word... it can also mean go down as in go down in history, your own ascent. Mary doesn't necessarily mean Mary, mother of Jesus. It might mean Mary Magdalene, the proclaimed whore who might have been the wife of Jesus – just as a symbol for someone who came off as one thing but actually had other intentions and did something else. Someone who's miscredited." He went on to state that the song was "more about friendship and how, together with someone else, you might have been something at one point and then you ended up just not being like that."

Release
On 12 September 2019, Ghost released a music video for "Kiss the Go-Goat", which depicts Papa Nihil performing as frontman of the band at the Whisky a Go Go in West Hollywood, California, in 1969. The following day, on 13 September 2019, Seven Inches of Satanic Panic was released on music streaming services through Loma Vista Recordings. It was released on 7" vinyl, with "Kiss the Go-Goat" as the A-side and "Mary on a Cross" as the B-side, on 27 September 2019. Seven Inches of Satanic Panic has been described as a two-track EP and as a single. The vinyl release peaked at number 2 on the UK Vinyl Singles Chart, whilst "Kiss the Go-Goat" reached number 4 on the Kerrang! Rock Chart.

In July and August 2022, "Mary on a Cross" went viral on TikTok. In response, Ghost released a "Slowed + Reverb" version of the song digitally on 26 August. The original recording then became the band's first to chart on the Billboard Hot 100 when it reached number 90 in September. An official "lyric video" for the song was released on 14 December. Similar to the video for "Kiss the Go-Goat", it features grainy, Super 8-like footage that is purported to be of Ghost performing in Los Angeles on 13 September 1969.

Track listing
All writing credited to Papa Emeritus Nihil and A Group of Nameless Ghouls.

Personnel
Ghost
 Papa Emeritus Nihil
 A Group of Nameless Ghouls

Charts

"Mary on a Cross"

Weekly charts

Year-end charts

Certifications

References

External links
 
 

Ghost (Swedish band) EPs
Loma Vista Recordings albums